is a subway station on the Tokyo Metro Ginza Line in Chiyoda, Tokyo, Japan, operated by the Tokyo subway operator Tokyo Metro. It is numbered "G-14".

Lines

Station layout
The station has two side platforms located on the first basement (B1F) level, serving two tracks.
The station has ticket gates at the entrances to the platforms.

As there is no underground concourse connecting the two platforms, both platforms have their own pair of exits. Platform 1 is served by exits 1 and 2, while platform 2 is served by exits 3 and 4. Passengers wishing to switch platforms must return to street level and cross Chuo-dori to reach the entrances for the other platform.

Platforms

History
Suehirocho Station opened on 1 January 1930.

The station facilities were inherited by Tokyo Metro after the privatization of the Teito Rapid Transit Authority (TRTA) in 2004.

Passenger statistics
In fiscal 2011, the station was used by an average of 20,426 passengers daily. By 2018, this had risen to 25,626.

Surrounding area
JR East's Akihabara Station is within walking distance of this station.
Akihabara
Kanda Shrine

References

External links

 Suehirocho station information (Tokyo Metro)

Railway stations in Tokyo
Tokyo Metro Ginza Line
Stations of Tokyo Metro
Railway stations in Japan opened in 1930